The 2008 Italian general election was the second in which Italian and dual citizens living outside the country could vote by postal ballot in international electoral districts. Twelve members of the Italian Chamber of Deputies and six members of the Italian Senate were elected in this way.

Italian and dual citizens in North America and Central America (including the Caribbean) elected one member of the Italian Senate. The winning candidate was Basilio Giordano from Silvio Berlusconi's party, known as the People of Freedom.

The process
All electors could vote for a political list and also cast a first preference vote for a specific candidate. The party with the highest number of list votes won the Senate seat, and the winning party's candidate with the highest number of first preference votes was declared elected.

The parties
Four electoral lists contested the North and Central American Senate division. The same lists also fielded candidates for the Chamber of Deputies and North and Central America.

The governing centre-left Democratic Party ran a united slate, as did Berlusconi's right-wing opposition list. The moderately conservative Union of the Centre (UDC), formerly aligned with Berlusconi, ran a separate list, as did a small coalition of right-wing and far-right parties called The Right–Tricolour Flame.

All of the party lists fielded two candidates.

The candidates

People of Freedom
Basilio Giordano is a publisher and former municipal politician in Montreal, Quebec, Canada.
Augusto Sorriso is a former mayor of Licata, Sicily, who subsequently became an entrepreneur based in New Jersey. He had previously sought election to the Italian Senate in 2006.

Democratic Party
Renato Turano is an entrepreneur in Chicago. He served in the Italian Senate from 2006 to 2008.
Marina Piazzi was born in Bologna on April 10, 1954, and moved to Mexico in 1976. She has taught Italian as a second language at the Istituto Italiano di Cultura in Mexico City and worked in the Italian department at the National Autonomous University of Mexico. Piazzi has been active for many years with the General Council for Italians Abroad and other Italian community organizations.

Union of the Centre
Massimo Seracini (June 7, 1943 – January 16, 2009) was born in Florence and received an economics degree from the University of Florence in 1962. He moved to the United States of America in the 1960s and worked in real estate in California. After his marriage failed, he returned to Florence and opened a bistro. He lived for extended periods in both countries during the last decades of his life and became a fixture of the Italian community in San Diego. Seracini had previously campaigned for an overseas seat in the Italian Chamber of Deputies in the 2006 general election as a candidate of the Union of Christian and Centre Democrats. A newspaper report from 2006 described him as "vague on details about his platform" but eager to serve Italians living in the diaspora.<ref>Rachel Rivera, "NY seeks Italy Senate seat to represent Italians abroad," Associated Press Newswires, 10 January 2006, 15:50.</ref> He died in San Diego in 2009, after a two-year battle with cancer.
Vittorio Coco is a broadcaster in Toronto, Ontario, Canada. He had previously sought election to the Italian Senate in 2006.

The Right–Tricolour Flame
Giuseppe (Joseph) P. Cirnigliaro was born on November 10, 1954, in Militello in Val di Catania, Sicily. He ran for the New York State Senate's 19th district in 1988 as a Republican. During the 2008 campaign, he argued that Italy should adopt a strong presidential model of government akin to that of the United States of America.
Franco Misuraca was born on June 10, 1943, in Aprigliano, Calabria, and later moved to Toronto, Ontario, Canada. He is a longtime supporter of the right-wing Italian Social Movement. In 2008, he centered his campaign around the slogan, "God, country, and family."

The results
Berlusconi's electoral coalition won a narrow plurality, defeating the Democratic Party by only 793 votes. Basilio Giordano received the most votes of the candidates on Berlusconi's list and was declared elected.

Democratic Party incumbent Renato Turano actually received more first preference votes than Giordano, but, as his party list was defeated, he was not returned to office.

Detailed results by country
More than 90 per cent of the total votes were cast in the United States of America and Canada. The Democratic Party won narrow victory in the United States, Mexico, and Nicaragua, but was defeated everywhere else. The People of Freedom won a narrow victory in Canada; this was a significant shift from the 2006 election, when the centre-left had won by a credible margin.

Antigua and Barbuda

Bahamas

Barbados

Belize

Canada

Costa Rica

Dominican Republic

El Salvador

Grenada

Guatemala

Haiti

Honduras

Mexico

Nicaragua

Panama

United States of AmericaNote: The country-by-country totals provided by the Italian Ministry of the Interior do not entirely correspond with the final totals provided by the same source. Adding up the country-by-country totals yields the following results: People of Freedom 37,774; Democratic Party 36,734; Union of the Centre 7,087; The Right–Tricolour Flame 2,126. These results are the same as the provisional totals provided by La Repubblica with 120 out of 123 polling districts reporting. It is therefore assumed that the country-by-country totals represent the provisional and not the final totals.''

References

2008 elections in Italy